The 1946 Ole Miss Rebels football team was an American football team that represented the University of Mississippi in the Southeastern Conference (SEC) during the 1946 college football season. In their first year under head coach Harold Drew, the Rebels compiled a 2–7 record (1–6 against SEC opponents) and were outscored by a total of 144 to 76.

Two Ole Miss player ranked among the national leaders. Charlie Conerly ranked sixth nationally with 641 passing yards. End Barney Poole ranked fifth nationally with 28 pass receptions.

Several Ole Miss players received honors from the Associated Press (AP) or United Press (UP) on the 1946 All-SEC football team: Poole at end (AP-1, UP-1); Conerly at halfback (UP-1); Shorty McWilliams at halfback (AP-1, UP-3); Al Sidorik at tackle (UP-1); end Bill Hildebrand at end (UP-2); Elbert Corley at center (UP-3); and Mike Mihalic at guard (UP-3).

The team played its home games at Crump Stadium in Memphis, Tennessee (three games) and at Hemingway Stadium in Oxford, Mississippi (two games).

Schedule

Roster
T Oliver Poole
G Phillip Poole
E Ray Poole

After the season

The 1947 NFL Draft was held on December 16, 1946. The following Rebel was selected.

References

Ole Miss
Ole Miss Rebels football seasons
Ole Miss Rebels football